Symonds Street is a street in Auckland, New Zealand's most populous city. The road runs southwest and uphill from the top of Anzac Avenue (originally Jermyn Street), through the City Campus of University of Auckland, over the Northwestern Motorway and Auckland Southern Motorway and to the start of New North Road and Mount Eden Road.

History

The route of Symonds Street originated as a Tāmaki Māori overland walking track, linking the Horotiu valley (modern-day Auckland CBD) and the Waitematā Harbour with other populated areas of the Tāmaki isthmus to the south.

During the early colonial era of Auckland, it was the main south-bound road. It was named after William Cornwallis Symonds in 1842, soon after his death.

Demographics
The statistical areas of Symonds Street North West, Symonds Street West and Symonds Street East encompass the area east of Queen Street and west of Grafton Gully.

Symonds Street had a population of 7,758 at the 2018 New Zealand census, an increase of 609 people (8.5%) since the 2013 census, and an increase of 3,057 people (65.0%) since the 2006 census. There were 3,147 households, comprising 3,876 males and 3,876 females, giving a sex ratio of 1.0 males per female, with 213 people (2.7%) aged under 15 years, 5,304 (68.4%) aged 15 to 29, 2,109 (27.2%) aged 30 to 64, and 135 (1.7%) aged 65 or older.

Ethnicities were 26.9% European/Pākehā, 4.4% Māori, 3.0% Pacific peoples, 63.1% Asian, and 8.4% other ethnicities. People may identify with more than one ethnicity.

The percentage of people born overseas was 77.2, compared with 27.1% nationally.

Although some people chose not to answer the census's question about religious affiliation, 53.0% had no religion, 22.1% were Christian, 0.1% had Māori religious beliefs, 7.1% were Hindu, 7.3% were Muslim, 4.6% were Buddhist and 2.6% had other religions.

Of those at least 15 years old, 2,643 (35.0%) people had a bachelor's or higher degree, and 273 (3.6%) people had no formal qualifications. 471 people (6.2%) earned over $70,000 compared to 17.2% nationally. The employment status of those at least 15 was that 2,484 (32.9%) people were employed full-time, 1,530 (20.3%) were part-time, and 603 (8.0%) were unemployed.

Notable locations

St Andrew's First Presbyterian Church, 2 Symonds St, 1850, oldest surviving chuch in Auckland.
Belgrave, 12 Symonds St, 1885, Two-storey Italianate house, now part of the University of Auckland.
House, 14 Symonds St, 1884, Two-storey Italianate house, now part of the University of Auckland.
House, 16 Symonds St, 1884, Two-storey Italianate house, now part of the University of Auckland.
Old Choral Hall, 5-7 Symonds St, 1872, A concert chamber and public hall, now part of the University of Auckland.
St Paul's Church, 28 Symonds St, 1895, Anglican church built on the site of the first church in Auckland.
Terrace Houses, 25-29 Symonds St, c.1897, private dwelling built by John Endean.
Aickin House, 39 Symonds St, 1920s neo-Georgian house.
New Zealand Wars memorial, corner Symonds St and Wakefield St, 1920, memorial to those who fought on the British side in the 19th century wars.
Cintra Flats, 9-13 Whitaker Place, 1936, apartment complex.
Rationalist House, 64 Symonds St, purchased in 1960 by the Rationalist Association as a base and library.
Doctors Residences, 84-86 Symonds St, 1935-1937, residences of two doctors designed by the same architect.
Plummer House, 5 City Road, 1909, residence of hat manufacturer and musician Charles Plummer.
Bus Shelter and Toilets, corner Symonds St and Grafton Bridge, 1910, bus shelter and public toilets.
Symonds Street Cemetery, 120 Symonds St, 1841, one of Auckland's oldest cemeteries.
Grafton Bridge, 1910, largest single-span of reinforced concrete in the world at the time of construction.
St Benedict's Church, 1 St Benedicts St, 1888, Gothic church building, possibly the largest in New Zealand at the time of construction.
Stables, 32 St Benedicts St, 1883, originally part of a larger complex hosting at least 30 Clydesdale horses.
Upper Symonds Street Historic Area, an area covering Symonds Street south of the Southern Motorway, and adjacent parts of Kyhber Pass Road, Newton Road, Mt Eden Road and New North Road.

References

Streets in Auckland
Auckland CBD